Jillian Williams may refer to:

 Jillian Williams (Home and Away), a character from the soap opera Home and Away (1999)
 Jillian Williams (volleyball), American sitting volleyball player